Daren Millard (born August 16, 1970 in Brandon, Manitoba, Canada) is a Canadian sportscaster.

Millard began his broadcasting career in radio as he worked in cities including Melfort, Saskatchewan, Portage la Prairie, Manitoba, Yorkton, Saskatchewan and Brandon, Manitoba and in television for CKX-TV in Brandon, Global Winnipeg and at CITV-TV. Millard joined Sportsnet in 1998 and held a number of roles throughout his time at the network which included hosting the coverage of the 2010 Winter Olympics men's ice hockey, Wednesday Night Hockey, Hockey Central at Noon, and regional Toronto Maple Leafs hockey games.  He also appeared on Tim & Sid.  On August 1, 2018 it was announced that Millard was leaving the network. As of September 2019, Millard now works the broadcast booth for the  Vegas Golden Knights  

Millard and his brother Dean (who works radio and television in Edmonton, AB) both attended Western Academy Broadcasting College in Saskatoon, Saskatchewan.

References

1970 births
Canadian sports talk radio hosts
Canadian television sportscasters
Living people
People from Brandon, Manitoba
Journalists from Manitoba
20th-century Canadian journalists
21st-century Canadian journalists